Joseph Jogindra Ghose (born 1869 - died 1942) of Allahabad, India. Son of Jadunath Ghose of Calcutta who was one of the earliest high-caste Hindu converts to Christianity in Bengal. Graduated from St. John's College, Agra in 1890 and passed his postgraduation from Allahabad University in 1892. He started his teaching career from St. John's College, Agra. He also served as the headmaster of the Government College, Ahmedabad, and Jumna High School, Allahabad.  He studied at the American College, Beyrout, Lebanon, and was the first Indian to do a D.Litt. from a foreign university. He did his D.Litt. in "The Spoken Arabic of Syria" from the University of Edinburgh, Scotland in 1909. Founder of the Modern High School in Allahabad which is now named after him. His first wife Manorama was the daughter of Col. Kali Prasad Gupta the first Indian FRCS and niece of the first Lord Sinha of Raipur.

After the death of his first wife, he married Muriel Cuthbertson, daughter of David Cuthbertson, noted Scottish writer, poet and Librarian at the University of Edinburgh. Author of the book "Adventures with Evil Spirits." Also the elder brother of Prof. Nathaniel Nath Ghosh of St. John's College, Agra who was instrumental in framing the syllabus of geography at Agra University in the early part of the 20th century.

References

1869 births
1942 deaths
Alumni of the University of Edinburgh